Tillandsia emergens is a species of plant in the family Bromeliaceae. It is endemic to Ecuador.

It is threatened by habitat loss.

References

Further reading

emergens
Vulnerable plants
Endemic flora of Ecuador
Taxonomy articles created by Polbot